Willem Reichert Barnard (born 1968) is a Southern African safari guide, photographer, aircraft pilot and instructor, and location manager for filmcrews all over Southern Africa. Willem is the second son of the Southern African "bush hero" Izak Barnard and grandson of the notorious outlaw hunter Bvekenya, also related to the famous heart transplant surgeon Christiaan Barnard. He is currently in charge of Penduka Safaris, the first company in the region to provide mobile safari services since 1963.

Career as a guide
At 20, having graduated from Pretoria Technikon with a degree in Nature Conservation, Willem started his career as a guide into the African bush. Profound bushlore, well imbibed from his childhood and adolescence experiences he enjoyed alongside his father, made him a safari guide with a reputation.
Currently Willem owns two companies, Penduka Safaris and the affiliated Penduka Travel, which specialises in tailor-made tours for independent travellers.
Pretty much unlike his grandfather, Willem is an ardent adherent of ecotourism.

Current projects
Willem has recorded the Bushmen music for the "Music That Floats From Afar" CD, DVD and book project, along with Herbert Brauer and Irene Murphy-Lewis.

He was also engaged as a Location manager for the well-known TV series "Testament to the Bushmen" (narrator Sir Laurens van der Post, director Paul Bellinger). Currently he invests a lot of effort into a documentary series entitled "Beyond the Passage of Time" by the Russian film studio "Yastreb Film", with Sergei Yastrzhembsky as director and producer.

In August 2010, he became a location manager for the team of Adventure Athletes Jukka Viljanen, Kirsi Montonen and Greg Maud during their 1000-km run across the Kalahari desert.

References 

White South African people
1968 births
Living people